Kim Song-bok (born 12 May 1952) is a North Korean former sports shooter. He competed in the 50 metre running target event at the 1972 Summer Olympics.

References

1952 births
Living people
North Korean male sport shooters
Olympic shooters of North Korea
Shooters at the 1972 Summer Olympics
Place of birth missing (living people)